Alessandro Antoniak Alves (born June 11, 1983) is a Brazil professional footballer who plays as a centre back for Regional League Division 2 club Ubon UMT United.

Honours

Club
Ubon UMT United
Regional League Division 2 (1): 2015

External links

1983 births
Living people
Brazilian footballers
Association football defenders
Alessandro Alves
Alessandro Alves
Alessandro Alves
Brazilian expatriate footballers
Brazilian expatriate sportspeople in Thailand
Expatriate footballers in Thailand